Green Grass may refer to:

 Green Grass, South Dakota, community in South Dakota
 "Green Grass" (song), song by Gary Lewis & the Playboys
 "Green Grass", song by Tom Waits on Real Gone (album)
 Green Grass (nuclear warhead), used on British nuclear weapon Yellow Sun

See also
 Greengrass, surname
 Greengrass Productions, production company
 Green Green Grass (disambiguation)